Roluos (Khmer: រលួស) is a Cambodian archeological site about 13 km east of Siem Reap along NH6. Once it was the seat of Hariharalaya, first capital of Khmer Empire north of Tonlé Sap (as the first capital in the strict sense of the term could have been Indrapura, identifiable with Banteay Prey Nokor).

Among the "Roluos Group" of temples there are some of the earliest permanent structures built by Khmer. They mark the beginning of classical period of Khmer civilization, dating from the late 9th century. Some were totally built with bricks, others partially with laterite or sandstone (the first large Angkorian temple built with sandstone was possibly Ta Keo)

At present it is composed by three major temples: Bakong, Lolei, and Preah Ko, along with the smaller Prasat Prei Monti. At both Bakong and Lolei there are contemporary Theravada buddhist monasteries.

There is a town named Roluos also Phumi Roluos Chas, which is a khum (commune) of Svay Chek District in Banteay Meanchey Province in north-western Cambodia.

Notes

References

External links

 Angkor Temple Guide: Roluos Group by Canby Publications

Populated places in Siem Reap province
Angkorian sites in Siem Reap Province
Towns in Cambodia